Durham FM was an Independent Local Radio station based in Durham, County Durham, England.

History
Since its launch in 2005, Durham FM was owned and operated by TLRC.

In December 2008, Durham FM submitted an application to Ofcom to co-locate with sister station, Sun FM in Sunderland. Following a consultation, the majority of responses were against the idea.

In July 2009, Ofcom give permission to rename Durham FM to Alpha Durham, and sister station Minster Northallerton to Alpha Northallerton. All programmes on would be shared, except for a local breakfast show and four-hour show on Saturday and Sunday, each produced and broadcast locally. Previously, TLRC asked for Ofcom approval to move Durham FM further north to Sunderland to share facilities with Sun FM, but a decision was delayed by the regulator.

Instead, the three stations became part of UKRD's Star brand and the station's frequencies are now used to broadcast Star Radio North East which was formed when UKRD merged the services of Durham FM with Alpha 103.2 and Minster Northallerton. Until 2010, a daily local breakfast show was produced for the former Durham FM area.

Ex-presenters

Peter Grant
Craig Andrews
Steve Phillips
Vic Ribbands
Chris Hakin
Dicky Ord
Dave 'Ceefax' Fenwick
Geoff Longstaff
Mike Jinx
Marie Gardiner
Mike Nicholson
Kyle Wilkinson
Les Gunn
Mike Patterson
Pete Clough
Mat Page
Tim West
Sarah Knapper
Lisa Dawson

Ex-Newsreaders

Julie Howe (News Editor)
Louise Bostock
Emily Bull
Ed Turner

References

External links
Media UK entry for Durham FM's rajar figures prior to September 2009 
A blog about the mergers of Durham FM, Alpha Radio and Minster Northallerton

Durham, England
The Local Radio Company
Radio stations in North East England
Defunct radio stations in the United Kingdom